Transposition is a group of congenital defects involving an abnormal spatial arrangement of tissue or organ.

Examples 
 Transposition of the great vessels, cardiac transposition, a congenital heart defect with malformation of any of the major vessels
 Transposition of teeth
 Penoscrotal transposition

References 

Congenital disorders